Heinz Holzer (born 28 August 1964) is an Italian former alpine skier who competed in the 1988 Winter Olympics. He has ranked #27 in the Giant Slalom event, and #11 in the Super G event at Calgary 1988.

References

External links
 

1964 births
Living people
Italian male alpine skiers
Olympic alpine skiers of Italy
Alpine skiers at the 1988 Winter Olympics
Germanophone Italian people
Sportspeople from Bruneck